William Hulme Lever, 2nd Viscount Leverhulme, DL (25 March 1888 – 27 May 1949), was the son of William Hesketh Lever and Elizabeth Ellen, daughter of Crompton Hulme of Bolton.

He was educated at Eton College and graduated from Cambridge University (Trinity College) in 1913 with a master's degree in the Arts. William Hulme Lever spent his early years at Thornton Manor which he inherited after his father's death in 1925.

Family

He married twice. His first wife was Marion Beatrice Smith (6 July 1886 – 30 August 1987), daughter of Bryce Smith and whom he married 13 April 1912 and divorced in 1936. They had three children: Elizabeth Ruth Lever was born 9 April 1913 and died 16 April 1972; his son Philip William Bryce Lever, 3rd Viscount Leverhulme, was born 1 July 1915 and died 4 July 2000; his second daughter Rosemary Gertrude Alexandra Lever was born 23 April 1919 and died 16 October 1994. He married Winifred Agnes Lloyd, daughter of Lt. Col. J. E. Lloyd, on 20 January 1937.

Business

The 2nd Viscount Leverhulme was a co-founder of Unilever in 1930. His company, Lever Brothers, merged with Margarine Unie that year.

Masonic movement

Due to the merger of the two firms, many staff employed at the Warrington factory were moved to London, including senior managers. This had the effect of disturbing attendance at the Masonic lodges in the Lever Brothers factory town, and as a result a new lodge was formed named the Mersey Lodge, no. 5434. The Petition to form Mersey Lodge was signed by the Master and Wardens of the Royal Alfred Lodge on 8 September 1933. As a result, Mersey Lodge was consecrated on 19 January 1934.

Belgian Congo

Lever Brothers operated from the Belgian Congo beginning in 1911. In response to civil unrest by the Congolese, the company "demanded more troops, more police and more brutality. When the railway lines around the Congo River rapids were rebuilt between 1923 and 1932 the regime mobilised 68,000 forced labourers of which 7,700 died". Due to their involvement with the Belgian Congo, there was a stark contrast to how the Leverhulmes are remembered at home in England.

Legacy

United Reformed Church of St Andrew and St George, Bolton

The 2nd Viscount Leverhulme's parents married at the United Reformed Church of St Andrew and St George in Bolton, on 17 April 1874. In 1936, William, 2nd Lord Leverhulme, paid for many improvements to the church, including widening the chancel and providing choir stalls, a communion table and a pulpit. He arranged for a new marble floor and the communion dais was finished with polished Hopton Wood stone. The chancel walls and the organ gallery were lined with carved Austrian oak panelling. He paid for two stained glass windows, one  illustrating the ‘Parable of the Talents’ in memory of his father, and another, ‘The Resurrection Morning’, in memory his mother.

Appointments and honours
 Captain in the service of the 4th/5th Cheshire Regiment (Territorial Army)
 High Sheriff of Cheshire in 1923
 Governor of Lever Brothers and Unilever 
 2nd Viscount Leverhulme, of the Western Isles, cos Inverness and Ross and Cromarty, 7 May 1925
 2nd Baron Leverhulme, of Bolton-le-Moors, co. Lancaster, 7 May 1925
 2nd Baronet Lever, 7 May 1925
 Knight of Justice, Order of St. John of Jerusalem (K.St.J.)
 Justice of the Peace (J.P.) for Cheshire
 Office of Deputy Lieutenant of Cheshire
 Rank of Honorary Air Commodore in the service of the No. 919/923 (West Lancashire) Balloon Squadron, Royal Auxiliary Air Force
 Pro-Chancellor of Liverpool University between 1932 and 1936
 Awarded of Osborne Reynolds Medal in 1937
 Office of Mayor of Bebington in 1937
 Honorary degree of Doctor of Law (LL.D.) by Liverpool University in 1937.
 Rank of Honorary Colonel in 1941 in the service of the 4th Anti-Aircraft Division, Royal Army Service Corps

Death

Lord Leverhulme died on 27 May 1949 and is interred with his parents at Christ Church in Port Sunlight. A valuable bust, by Sir Charles Wheeler, of William, 2nd Viscount Leverhulme, was stolen in 2009 from the plinth near his parents' tombs in Christ Church, Port Sunlight. It is feared it may have been melted down for scrap.

References

External links

 Christ Church, Port Sunlight: Photograph of Leverhulme memorial 
 The United Reformed Church of St Andrew and St George, Its Origin and History

Viscounts in the Peerage of the United Kingdom
1888 births
1949 deaths
People educated at Eton College
Alumni of Trinity College, Cambridge
Deputy Lieutenants of Cheshire
Lever family
Cheshire Regiment officers
British Army personnel of World War II
Royal Army Service Corps officers